Abdul Qayyum Sajjadi was elected to represent Ghazni Province in Afghanistan's Wolesi Jirga, the lower house of its National Legislature, in 2005. He is a member of the Hazara ethnic group.
He speaks English and was the editor of a science
journal prior to taking office.

See also 
 List of Hazara people

References

External links 
 http://afghan-bios.info/Dr Abdul Qayum Sajjadi

Politicians of Ghazni Province
Living people
Members of the House of the People (Afghanistan)
Hazara politicians
Year of birth missing (living people)